Ulmus 'Fiorente' is a hybrid cultivar elm derived from a crossing of the Siberian Elm Ulmus pumila clone 'S.10' (female parent) from Lucca, Italy, with the Ulmus minor clone 'C.02' from Lungarno, Florence, by the Istituto per la Protezione delle Piante (IPP), part of the Italian National Research Council, in Florence. The tree is protected by Plant Breeders' Rights bestowed by the EU on 25 March 2010.

'Fiorente' was introduced to the UK in 2007 by Hampshire & Isle of Wight Branch, Butterfly Conservation as part of its assessment of DED-resistant cultivars as potential hosts of the endangered White-letter Hairstreak.

Description
'Fiorente' is usually monopodial, and capable of exceptionally rapid development; during trials in the Northern Apennine on poor clay soils, growth exceeded 1.0 m in height and 1.5 cm in trunk d.b.h per annum. The tree's habit is conical, with a pronounced apical dominance; lateral growth is limited, the crown therefore rather columnar. The alternate leaves are of moderate size, < 8 cm long × < 5 cm broad; generally lanceolate in shape, they are rough on the upper surface and pubescent beneath, remaining green well into the autumn and shed relatively late, often persisting into December in the UK. The tree usually commences flowering in its fourth or fifth year, during late February in Italy, but as early as mid-January in southern England. The sessile samarae are rounded, typically Ø15 mm, the seed central. The tree suckers from the roots, but only where the root has been exposed and damaged.

Pests and diseases
Specimens in the field in Italy have exhibited no symptoms of DED or elm yellows. Susceptibility to the elm leaf beetle Xanthogaleruca luteola is much the same as that of the Field Elm Ulmus minor.

Cultivation
In Italy, the cultivar's rapid growth has bestowed it economic potential as a hardwood timber and biomass tree. Introduced to southern England in 2007 by Butterfly Conservation, the tree is not known to have been introduced to North America or Australasia.  'Fiorente' is exclusively propagated by the Eisele nursery in Darmstadt as one of its 'Resista' series

Etymology
'Fiorente' translates as 'flourishing'.

Accessions

Europe
Grange Farm Arboretum, Sutton St. James, Spalding, UK. Acc. no. 693.
Great Fontley Farm, Fareham, UK. Butterfly Conservation Elm Trials plantation, two trees planted 2007.
Royal Botanic Garden Edinburgh, UK. Acc. no. 20080340
Royal Botanic Gardens, Kew, UK. Acc. no. not known.
Sir Harold Hillier Gardens, Ampfield, UK. Acc. no. 2008.0367
Wijdemeren City Council, Netherlands. Elm collection, ‘s-Gravelandsevaartweg, Loosdrecht, 10 trees planted 2018

Nurseries

Europe
Eisele nursery, Darmstadt, Germany
Hillier's Nurseries, Liss, Hants. UK
Noordplant, Glimmen, Netherlands.

References

Hybrid elm cultivar
Ulmus articles with images
Ulmus